= Maybert, California =

Maybert
- Former settlement
- Location in California
- Coordinates: 39°21′10″N 120°41′59″W
- Country: United States
- State: California
- County: Nevada County
- Elevation: 3,245 ft (989 m)

Maybert was a mining town in Nevada County, California. It was located on the south side of the South Yuba River, about 6 miles east of the town of Washington, at an elevation of 3,245 ft (989 m). Fall Creek empties into the South Yuba slightly to the northwest of the town site.

== Origins ==
Maybert was located on a rich vein of gold bearing quartz and was surrounded by a number of prominent quartz mines. The origins of the town and its name are not well documented. The earliest newspaper references to Maybert are in 1886 when one paper referred to it as "a recent addition to the county geography." It appears to have sprung up around that time to house and serve the area's mines and their workers. The Yuba Mine had been "staked out" in 1855. In 1875, the County Board of Supervisors approved a petition to construct a road and necessary bridges from the town of Washington to the Yuba Mine. The road and a "splendid" bridge was completed in 1876. At that time, the area that became the Maybert townsite was generally referred to as "the Yuba Mine situated above Washington", or words to that effect. One historian states that the town was named after a mine at the site, but Hartwell's 1880 map depicts only the Yuba Mine at what became the Maybert townsite. There are no contemporary news reports of a mine named Maybert. Most likely, the name was that of a prominent local resident and was assigned to the site when a post office was established in 1886.

== Heyday ==
The town's heyday was from the mid-1880s to the early 1900s. Importantly, the town was connected by a new 7 mile easterly road to the Central Pacific station at Emigrant Gap. A school located near the Yuba Mine opened in 1886, and a school district was established that year. It had 10 students in 1888. Maybert had its own election district and 32 votes were cast in the 1892 presidential election. By 1886, Maybert was connected by stage to the town of Washington and to Nevada City. Soon, there was stage service to Downieville and many points in Nevada County. It had its own telephone company.

While some of the mines had their own boardinghouses, the town also had a hotel with saloon, the Maybert, run by the Baugh Bros. The hotel was the site of dances and other social events. One Fourth of July featured a tug-of-war between teams from the Yuba and Eagle Bird mines, followed by a grand ball for the benefit of the school. There was also for a time a hotel located at the Eagle Bird mine run by the McKees.

== Post office ==
A post office was established at Maybert in 1886. It was located in the Yuba Mine store and Superintendent George Hare was the first postmaster. Scheduled mail service was 6 times a week from Nevada City. The post office was discontinued in 1905, presumably because the towns population had substantially declined with inactivity at the mines. With the reopening of the Yuba, Eagle Bird and other mines, the post office was revived in 1907 and continued operation until 1910. When there was no post office, residents got mail in the town of Washington.

== Mining ==
From its inception to its demise, Maybert's fortunes were tied in closely with its mines. The sawmills in the area appear to have existed principally to serve the mines and there are no reports of agriculture or horticulture in the area. The principal mines were the Yuba, Eagle Bird, Blue Bell and Blue Jay.

It all began with the discovery of the Yuba Mine in 1855, which over the years produced $2 million in gold. In the 1880s and early 90s, the mine worked "full forces of men". In 1891, with one of the owners being the George Hearst Estate, it employed 75 men and ran 25 stamps to crush the quartz. It soon closed down. In the early part of the 20th century, the mine resumed successful operations. It was merged with the Mayflower Mine in the hills above Maybert and a tramway was built to bring ore from the Mayflower down to the Yuba for processing. About 60 man were then employed in the two properties and the mill. In 1909, its new boarding house burned down. After laying idle for a few years, new owners took over the mine, along with the Grey Eagle in 1915.

The Eagle Bird Mine, situated 3/4 of a mile west of Maybert, had a similar trajectory. In 1887, the mine was working "full force." In 1888, the mine changed hands and it was reported "that the Eagle Bird will again prove to be a dividend paying property under intelligent and economical management." In 1890, the State Mineralogist, reported that the mine then employed about 75 people, had its own sawmill and its miners were paid $3 a day and mill men $3–3.50. By 1891, its work force had increased to 100 and it was running 30 stamps. It then ran into financial difficulties and in 1893 was sold to new owners who announced new development plans. The next year, a rich strike was reported and the "mine looks splendid." But in 1896, the State Mineralogist reported that the Eagle Bird was again not being worked. The mine was sold several times in the ensuing years, with mining continuing sporadically well into the 20th century. In 1909, a fire burned down all the mine's buildings. By 1913, the Eagle Bird had yielded about $1.5 million in gold. In 1915, it was sold again to some eastern interests. It then was described as having "been idle for many years for the want of sufficient capital to do the necessary development work to reach a ledge that contains the pay rock."

At a time when many mines in Nevada County would not employ Chinese, the Maybert mines, especially the Yuba and Eagle Bird, did. In 1888, the Yuba suspended work for two days to give the Chinese time to celebrate the lunar new year. Chinese miners were typically paid 30 to 50% less than white miners.

In 1934, most of the mines in the Maybert area were consolidated into a new company - Maybert Gold Mines. Most gold mining was suspended during World War II as nonessential for the war effort, and there is no record of Maybert mines being revived on a commercial scale afterward.

== The twentieth century ==
Whenever the mines were shut down for an extended period of time, the town itself suffered. As noted above, the post office was discontinued at the end of 1905 though it was revived briefly when the mines reopened in 1907. Likewise, the election district was abolished in 1906 because the town was "almost uninhabited."

Up until the 1960s, some cabins remained and were occupied by squatters. The forest service, with the property-owner's permission, burned the remaining buildings to the ground to drive the squatters out and avoid the risk of wildfire from people squatting there. Today, there are few remains of the old town site, which is difficult to access because there no longer is a bridge across the Yuba at the townsite. The area is popular with hikers, campers and fishermen. The land is privately held, but surrounded by the Tahoe National Forest.

A You Tube video called Exploring the Yuba River Mines depicts a plucky member of TVR Exploration exploring the Maybert area and the Yuba Mine. It contains fascinating images of the mine underground.
